The 2006 UCI Cyclo-cross World Championships were held in Zeddam, the Netherlands from Saturday January 28 to Sunday January 29, 2006.

Medal summary

Medal table

Men's Elite
 Held on Sunday January 29, 2006

Men's Juniors
 Held on Saturday January 28, 2006

Men's Espoirs
 Held on Saturday January 28, 2006

Women's Elite
 Held on Sunday January 29, 2006

External links
 Sports123
 CyclingNews

See also
 2006 World University Cycling Championship

UCI Cyclo-cross World Championships
World Championships
C
C
January 2006 sports events in Europe